Jinping may refer to:

Xi Jinping (习近平), General Secretary of the Chinese Communist Party

Locations in the People's Republic of China
Jinping Mountains (锦屏山), in Sichuan
Jinping Miao, Yao, and Dai Autonomous County (金平苗族瑶族傣族自治县), of Honghe Prefecture, Yunnan
Jinping County, Guizhou (锦屏县), of Qiandongnan Prefecture, Guizhou
Jinping District (金平区), Shantou, Guangdong
Jinping-I Hydropower Station, on the Yalong River in Sichuan
Jinping-II Hydropower Station, on the Yalong River in Sichuan
Jinping Road Station (金平路站), station on the Shanghai Metro
 Hong Kong
Kam Ping (constituency) (Jinping in Mandarin)

Towns (锦屏镇)
Jinping, Chongxin County, in Chongxin County, Gansu
Jinping, Yiyang County, Henan, in Yiyang County, Henan
Jinping, Lianyungang, in Haizhou District, Lianyungang, Jiangsu
Jinping, Jingdong County, in Jingdong Yi Autonomous County, Yunnan
Jinping, Qiubei County, in Qiubei County, Yunnan